José María Fernández (Buenos Aires, 16 December 1928 - Paris, 14 July 2006), better known as Pepe Fernández, was an Argentine photographer, writer and pianist who lived in France since the 1960s.

References

1928 births
2006 deaths
Argentine photographers